Raymond Lynch may refer to:

 Ray Lynch (born 1943), American guitarist and lutenist
 Raymond J. Lynch (1909–2007), U.S. judge 
 E. Raymond Lynch (1922–2013), member of the Pennsylvania House of Representatives